F4, F.IV, F04, F 4, F.4 or F-4 may refer to:

Aircraft
 Flanders F.4, a 1910s British experimental military two-seat monoplane aircraft 
 Martinsyde F.4 Buzzard, a British World War I fighter version of the Martinsyde Buzzard biplane
 Fokker F.IV, a 1921 Dutch airliner
 Caproni Vizzola F.4, an Italian prototype fighter of 1939
 Lockheed F-4 Lightning, a reconnaissance variant of the Lockheed P-38 Lightning World War 2 fighter
 Fleetwings Sea Bird, a variant of which was the F-4
 A number of aircraft that first entered service with the U.S. Navy:
 Curtiss F4C, a 1920s version of the Naval Aircraft Factory TS biplane fighter
 Boeing F4B, a 1930s version of the Boeing P-12 biplane fighter
 Grumman F4F Wildcat, a carrier-based fighter aircraft in World War 2
 Vought F4U Corsair, a World War 2 fighter
 Douglas F4D Skyray, a carrier-based fighter/interceptor, first flight 1951
 McDonnell Douglas F-4 Phantom II, a supersonic fighter-bomber, first flight 1958

Art, entertainment, and music
 F4, or Flower 4, the four handsome boys appearing in Japanese manga Boys Over Flowers
 F4 (band), Taiwanese boy band
 F4 Thailand, a Thai television series
 F4, Middle F (musical note)
 Fantastic Four, fictional superhero team

Computing and technology
 Faugère's F4 algorithm in computer algebra
 F4, a function key on a computer keyboard
 f4transkript, a transcription software
 Samsung Galaxy F04, an Android-based smartphone manufactured by Samsung Electronics

Mathematics
 F4 (mathematics), the name of a Lie group and also its Lie algebra f4
 F4, Fermat number

Sports and games
 F4 (classification), a wheelchair sport classification
 Formula 4, a class of car racing
 f4, designates a square in Algebraic notation (chess)
 1. f4, or Bird's opening, an opening move in chess

Transportation and vehicles
 F4 (Istanbul Metro), a funicular railway in Istanbul Turkey
 F4 Cross Harbour, or Cross Harbour ferry services, Sydney, Australia
 Albarka Air (IATA code), a Nigerian airline
 Front-engine, four-wheel-drive layout, in automotive design
 MV Agusta F4 series, a series of motorcycles
 Saginaw Airport (FAA identifier F04), a defunct public airport in Fort Worth, Texas, U.S.
 USS F-4, a U.S. Navy submarine that sank near Honolulu harbor in 1915
 LNER Class F4, a class of British steam locomotives

Other uses
 F4, a paper size
 F 4 Frösön, a former Swedish Air Force wing
 f/4, an f-number of an optical system such as a camera lens
 F-4 Object, or Rákosi bunker, a formerly secret nuclear shelter in Budapest, Hungary
 Form F-4, an American form used to register securities
 Nikon F4, a camera
 F4, a tornado intensity rating on the Fujita scale
 F4, an electrode site according to the 10–20 system (EEG)

See also
 4F (disambiguation)
 Four Fs (disambiguation)